The 2014 Paris–Tours was the 108th edition of the Paris–Tours cycle race and was held on 12 October 2014. The race started in Saint-Arnoult-en-Yvelines and finished in Tours. The race was won by Jelle Wallays of the  team.

Teams
A total of 21 teams raced in the 2014 Paris–Tours: 11 UCI ProTeams, 7 UCI Professional Continental teams, and 3 UCI Continental teams.

Results

References

External links

2014 in French sport
2014
October 2014 sports events in France